The Women's 4 × 5 kilometre relay at the FIS Nordic World Ski Championships 2011 was held on 3 March 2011 at 14:00 CET. The defending world champions were the Finnish team of Pirjo Muranen, Virpi Kuitunen, Riitta-Liisa Roponen and Aino-Kaisa Saarinen while the defending Olympic champions were the Norwegian team of Vibeke Skofterud, Therese Johaug, Kristin Størmer Steira and Marit Bjørgen. Kuitunen retired after the 2009-10 season.

Results

See also
2011 IPC Biathlon and Cross-Country Skiing World Championships – Women's relay

References

FIS Nordic World Ski Championships 2011
2011 in Norwegian women's sport